Journal of Addictions & Offender Counseling is a biannual peer-reviewed academic journal published by Wiley-Blackwell on behalf of the American Counseling Association and the International Association of Addictions and Offender Counselors.  The journal was established in 1980.  Its current editor-in-chief is Trevor Buser. The journal focuses on prevention and treatment programs, the attitudes and behaviors of substance abuse professionals, tested techniques, treatment of adolescents and adults, and qualitative and quantitative studies.

External links 
 

Wiley-Blackwell academic journals
English-language journals
Publications established in 1980
Psychotherapy journals
Biannual journals